MSON may refer to:

Malone School Online Network, of which the Casady School is part
Multiple sclerosis associated optic neuritis, a kind of Optic neuropathy